Milos Kerkez (born 7 November 2003) is a professional footballer who plays as a left-back for Eredivisie club AZ Alkmaar. Born in Serbia, he represents the Hungary national team.

Club career
Kerkez joined Austrian side Rapid Wien in 2014, and played there until 2019.

Győr 
In 2020, he was signed by Nemzeti Bajnokság II club Győri ETO FC. In an interview with scoutedftbl.com, Kerkez said that during his period at Győr he decided to become a Hungarian international because he got a lot of help and support from his coaches and teammates in Győr.

AC Milan 
On 2 February 2021, he was signed by Serie A giant A.C. Milan. Paolo Maldini phoned him a couple of days before the end of the transfer season. Kerkez, in an interview with Nemzeti Sport, said that you cannot say no when Maldini calls you. So Kerkez decided to leave Győr and join AC Milan. On 17 July 2021, Kerkez played his first match with the senior team in a training match against Pro Sesto 1913. However, he was not given enough opportunity; therefore, he decided to leave AC Milan in 2022.

AZ 
On 29 January 2022, he was signed by Eredivisie club AZ Alkmaar. On 19 May 2022, he played his first match for AZ against SC Heerenveen at the Abe Lenstra Stadion, Heerenveen, the Netherlands. The match ended with a 3-2 win for Heerenveen and Kerkez was substituted in the 77th minute. On 14 August 2022, he scored his first goal in the Eredivisie against Sparta Rotterdam at the Sparta Stadion Het Kasteel, Rotterdam in the 2022–23 Eredivisie season. The match was won by AZ 3-2 and Kerkez scored the winning goal in the 77th minute.

International career
Kerkez was called up by the senior Hungary team for the Nations League matches against England (home), Italy (away), Germany (home) and England (away) on 4, 7, 11 and 14 June 2022 respectively. He made his first senior national team appearance on 23 September 2022, against Germany (away).

Career statistics

Club

Notes

References

2003 births
Living people
People from Vrbas, Serbia
Hungarian footballers
Serbian footballers
Serbian people of Hungarian descent
Association football defenders
FK Hajduk Kula players
SK Rapid Wien players
Győri ETO FC players
A.C. Milan players
AZ Alkmaar players
Nemzeti Bajnokság II players
Eerste Divisie players
Eredivisie players
Hungary youth international footballers
Hungary under-21 international footballers
Hungary international footballers
Hungarian expatriate footballers
Hungarian expatriate sportspeople in Austria
Expatriate footballers in Austria
Hungarian expatriate sportspeople in Italy
Expatriate footballers in Italy
Hungarian expatriate sportspeople in the Netherlands
Expatriate footballers in the Netherlands